Minsk Hero City Obelisk is a 45 meters tall monument in the shape of an obelisk located on the Victors Avenue in Minsk, Belarus. The Obelisk is dedicated to the fact that Minsk was declared a Hero City on 26 June 1974 for its people's bravery during the Nazi occupation that lasted for 1,100 days. The Obelisk was opened in 1985 commemorating the 40th anniversary of victory in the Great Patriotic War.

Construction 
The designer of the Obelisk was a sculptor Valentin Zankovich. He embodied the vision of the architects V. Yevseev, V. Kramarenko, and V. Romanenko. The monument is topped with the Gold Star medal surrounded by the laurel branch.

Complex 
At the moment, the Obelisk is a part of the large complex of the Belarusian Great Patriotic War Museum. At the bottom visitors can see an engraved text that describes the acquisition of the «Hero City» title by Minsk. Standing with fanfares raised high, the symbolic figure of the Motherland is part of the monument. Nowadays military parades and processions on the day of the key national holiday – Independence Day – take place near the Minsk Hero City Obelisk.

See also

Leningrad Hero City Obelisk
Hero City

References 

Buildings and structures completed in 1985
Buildings and structures in Minsk
Monuments and memorials in Belarus
Tourist attractions in Minsk
Obelisks
Victory monuments